Albert Eugène Laverne (13 April 1866 – 23 June 1941) was a sailor from France, who represented his country at the 1900 Summer Olympics in Meulan, France. Laverne as helmsman, was disqualified in first race of the 0.5 to 1 ton and did not finish in the second race. He did this with the boat Sidi-Fekkar.

Further reading

References

External links

French male sailors (sport)
Sailors at the 1900 Summer Olympics – .5 to 1 ton
Olympic sailors of France
1866 births
1941 deaths
Sailors at the 1900 Summer Olympics – 1 to 2 ton
Sailors at the 1900 Summer Olympics – Open class
Sportspeople from Paris